
Gmina Miejska Górka is an urban-rural gmina (administrative district) in Rawicz County, Greater Poland Voivodeship, in west-central Poland.

Villages
Apart from the town of Miejska Górka, Gmina Miejska Górka contains the villages and settlements of Annopol, Dąbrowa, Dłoń, Gostkowo, Jagodnia, Karolinki, Kołaczkowice, Konary, Melanowo, Niemarzyn, Oczkowice, Piaski, Roszkówko, Roszkowo, Rozstępniewo, Rzyczkowo, Sobiałkowo, Topólka, Woszczkowo, Zakrzewo, Zalesie and Zmysłowo.

Neighbouring gminas
Gmina Miejska Górka is bordered by the gminas of Bojanowo, Jutrosin, Krobia, Pakosław, Pępowo, Poniec and Rawicz.

References
Polish official population figures 2006

Miejska Gorka
Rawicz County